Heat is the soundtrack album to the 1995 film Heat. The score is compiled mostly with Elliot Goldenthal's orchestrations although there are a variety of other artists featured including U2/Brian Eno project Passengers, Lisa Gerrard, Moby and Terje Rypdal.

The score

The track "New Dawn Fades" is only a part of the original song, and which fades into the next track. The track "God Moving Over the Face of the Waters" is slightly different from the version used in the film, the version on the score is from Moby's album Everything Is Wrong and the version in the film appears later on his 1997 album I Like to Score; Goldenthal composed and arranged the Kronos Quartet -performed pieces. The Einstürzende Neubauten track "Armenia" was taken from their 1983 album Zeichnungen des Patienten O. T. and was used by Michael Mann again in his 1999 film The Insider.

Goldenthal composed a cue called "Hand in Hand" originally meant to be played over the end scene, but it was replaced by Moby's "God Moving Over the Face of the Waters", so he used it, replacing guitars with bagpipes, instead for the end titles to Michael Collins. A clip of the track as it was meant to be heard in Heat can be heard below. There is also an "extended version" of the score in bootleg form, with several tracks (including "Hand in Hand") which can be heard in the film but are not on the score released, available on the internet.

Various tracks that were in some points of the film but did not make it to the soundtrack included pieces by William Orbit from his Strange Cargo albums, namely "The Last Lagoon," "Monkey King," and "The Mighty Limpopo."

Goldenthal explained his thinking behind the score:
In Heat, Michael Mann and I were going for an atmospheric situation. It was the first time I used what I like to call a "guitar orchestra" – where I use six or eight guitars, all playing with different tunings stacked up on top of each other in a musical way, and a mixed meter of percussion. It wasn't a type of score where you needed a big orchestral theme or you had to actually hit certain actions with music at specific times. It was much closer to the European mentality of film scoring.

The guitar orchestra, who play most significantly on two of the tracks below, is called "Deaf Elk" (an ensemble which includes Page Hamilton of the metal band Helmet) who also worked with Goldenthal for his scores, In Dreams and Titus.

The song "Always Forever Now" was written and performed by U2 and Brian Eno under the alias Passengers, and appears on Original Soundtracks 1. But the version featured on this soundtrack, and quite prominently in the film, is a longer mix with some minor variations.

Track listing

Reception

Personnel

Orchestral music
Composer, Vocals, Orchestration – Elliot Goldenthal
Orchestration – Robert Elhai
Musical Score Producer – Matthias Gohl
Conductor – Steven Mercurio
Conductor – Jonathan Sheffer
"Deaf Elk" Guitars – Page Hamilton, Eric Hubel, Bobby Hambel, David Reid
Guitar – Michael Thompson
Guitar – Mark Stewart
Drums – Audun Kleive
Performer – The Kronos Quartet
Electronic Music Producer – Richard Martinez
Engineer, Mixing – Joel Iwataki
Music Editor – Christopher Brooks
Music Editor – Michael Connell
Music Editor, Mastering – Tom Baker
Mastering – Vladimir Meller
Assistant Engineer – Andrew Warwick
Score Mixer & Recordist – Stephen McLaughlin

Artists
"Always Forever Now"
Performer – Passengers
Engineer – Danton Supple
Assistant Engineer – Rob Kirwan
Sequencing – Des Broadbery
String Arrangements – Paul Barrett
Music Supervisor – Budd Carr
"Last Nite", "Mystery Man"
Guitar, Keyboards, Performer – Terje Rypdal
Performer – The Chasers
Bass – Bjorn Kjellemyr
Keyboards – Allan Dangerfield
Producer – Manfred Eicher
"Ultramarine"
Producer, Performer – Michael Brook
"Armenia"
Producer, Performer – Einstürzende Neubauten
"New Dawn Fades", "God Moving Over The Face Of The Waters"
Producer, Performer, Writer – Moby
Writer "New Dawn Fades" – Joy Division
"Force Marker"
Producer, Performer – Brian Eno
"La Bas", "Gloradin"
Producer, Performer – Lisa Gerrard

Executive credit
Executive Producer – Michael Mann
Executive in Charge of Music – Gary LeMel
Assistant Music Supervisor – Amy Dunn
Orchestra Contractor – Debbie Datz-Pyle, Patty Zimmitti

References

External links
 
 Page for the score on Goldenthal's website

1995 soundtrack albums
Crime film soundtracks
Elliot Goldenthal soundtracks
Warner Records soundtracks